Jacob Aall Ottesen Preus (August 28, 1883May 24, 1961) was an American politician. He served as the 8th state auditor of Minnesota from January 5, 1915, to January 5, 1921, and as the 20th Governor of Minnesota from January 5, 1921, to January 6, 1925. He was a Republican.

Background
He was born in Columbia County, Wisconsin, on August 28, 1883, of Norwegian descent. The grandson, son, father, grandfather, and great-grandfather of Lutheran pastors, he chose to serve the state rather than the church. He was a 1903 graduate of Luther College in Decorah, Iowa, where his extended family has had a key role in the development, governance, and academic life of the college-community since its founding in 1862.

As a recent graduate of the University of Minnesota Law School he cut his political teeth in Washington as executive clerk to Senator Knute Nelson. Back home after three years, he continued his climb up the Republican ladder of state service toward the governor's office.

Career

When Preus first ran for governor in 1920, he adamantly opposed the Farmer-Labor Party, a coalition of discontented farmers and laborers who had formed a new political organization. The party, he declaimed, represented "socialism – a political cult that would destroy the principles of private property, our religion, and our homes."

Despite his reservations about the Farmer-Labor philosophy, Governor Preus nonetheless encouraged the legislature to meet some of the farmers' demands by broadening the legal powers of cooperatives, making low-interest loans available through the Rural Credit Bureau, and creating the Department of Agriculture. Preus also demanded higher taxes from the owners of ore-rich mines on the Iron Range, expanded highway construction, and improved equal rights and election procedures. His political savvy, combined with an apparent desire to correct inequities, made Minnesota's twentieth governor a surprisingly prolific reformer.

After completing his second term, Preus became an insurance executive in Chicago. He returned to Minneapolis in 1958 and served until his death as board chairman of Lutheran Brotherhood, a fraternal insurance society he had co-founded in 1917. He also founded the Aid Association for Lutherans, which consolidated in the 1990s to become Thrivent Financial for Lutherans.

Personal life
Preus was married during 1909 to Idella Louise Haugen. Their son, Jacob Aall Ottesen Preus II, was a theologian, professor, author, and president of the Lutheran Church–Missouri Synod. Their other son, Robert Preus, was a Lutheran pastor, professor, author, theologian, and president of Concordia Theological Seminary. He died on May 24, 1961.

See also 
Herman Amberg Preus (1825–1894)
Christian Keyser Preus (1852–1921)
Ove J. H. Preus (1880–1951)
J. A. O. Preus III (born 1953)
David W. Preus (1922–2021)

References

Biographical information  and his  gubernatorial records are available for research use at the Minnesota Historical Society.

External links
Photos
J. A. O. Preus with Eleonora and Ethel Olson

1883 births
1961 deaths
People from Columbia County, Wisconsin
American Lutherans
American people of Norwegian descent
Republican Party governors of Minnesota
State Auditors of Minnesota
University of Minnesota alumni
University of Minnesota Law School alumni
Luther College (Iowa) alumni
20th-century American politicians
20th-century Lutherans